In mathematics, a projective bundle is a fiber bundle whose fibers are projective spaces.

By definition, a scheme X over a Noetherian scheme S is a Pn-bundle if it is locally a projective n-space; i.e.,  and transition automorphisms are linear. Over a regular scheme S such as a smooth variety, every projective bundle is of the form  for some vector bundle (locally free sheaf) E.

The projective bundle of a vector bundle 
Every vector bundle over a variety X gives a projective bundle by taking the projective spaces of the fibers, but not all projective bundles arise in this way: there is an obstruction in the cohomology group H2(X,O*). To see why, recall that a projective bundle comes equipped with transition functions on double intersections of a suitable open cover. On triple overlaps, any lift of these transition functions satisfies the cocycle condition up to an invertible function. The collection of these functions forms a 2-cocycle which vanishes in H2(X,O*) only if the projective bundle is the projectivization of a vector bundle. In particular, if X is a compact Riemann surface then H2(X,O*)=0, and so this obstruction vanishes.

The projective bundle of a vector bundle E is the same thing as the Grassmann bundle  of 1-planes in E.

The projective bundle P(E) of a vector bundle E is characterized by the universal property that says:
Given a morphism f: T → X, to factorize f through the projection map  is to specify a line subbundle of f*E.
For example, taking f to be p, one gets the line subbundle O(-1) of p*E, called the tautological line bundle on P(E). Moreover, this O(-1) is a universal bundle in the sense that when a line bundle L gives a factorization f = p ∘ g, L is the pullback of O(-1) along g. See also Cone#O(1) for a more explicit construction of O(-1).

On P(E), there is a natural exact sequence (called the tautological exact sequence):

where Q is called the tautological quotient-bundle.

Let E ⊂ F be vector bundles (locally free sheaves of finite rank) on X and G = F/E. Let q: P(F) → X be the projection. Then the natural map  is a global section of the sheaf hom . Moreover, this natural map vanishes at a point exactly when the point is a line in E; in other words, the zero-locus of this section is P(E).

A particularly useful instance of this construction is when F is the direct sum E ⊕ 1 of E and the trivial line bundle (i.e., the structure sheaf). Then P(E) is a hyperplane in P(E ⊕ 1), called the hyperplane at infinity, and the complement of P(E) can be identified with E. In this way, P(E ⊕ 1) is referred to as the projective completion (or "compactification") of E.

The projective bundle P(E) is stable under twisting E by a line bundle; precisely, given a line bundle L, there is the natural isomorphism:

such that  (In fact, one gets g by the universal property applied to the line bundle on the right.)

Examples 
Many non-trivial examples of projective bundles can be found using fibrations over  such as Lefschetz fibrations. Because every elliptic curve is a genus 1 curve with a distinguished point, there exists a global section of the fibration. Note this equation is well-defined because each term in the Weierstrass equation has total degree  (meaning the degree of the coefficient plus the degree of the monomial. For example).

Cohomology ring and Chow group 
Let X be a complex smooth projective variety and E a complex vector bundle of rank r on it. Let p: P(E) → X be the projective bundle of E. Then the cohomology ring H*(P(E)) is an algebra over H*(X) through the pullback p*. Then the first Chern class ζ = c1(O(1)) generates H*(P(E)) with the relation

where ci(E) is the i-th Chern class of E. One interesting feature of this description is that one can define Chern classes as the coefficients in the relation; this is the approach taken by Grothendieck.

Over fields other than the complex field, the same description remains true with Chow ring in place of cohomology ring (still assuming X is smooth). In particular, for Chow groups, there is the direct sum decomposition

As it turned out, this decomposition remains valid even if X is not smooth nor projective. In contrast, Ak(E) = Ak-r(X), via the Gysin homomorphism, morally because that the fibers of E, the vector spaces, are contractible.

See also 
Proj construction
cone (algebraic geometry)
ruled surface (an example of a projective bundle)
Severi–Brauer variety
Hirzebruch surface

References

  
 

Algebraic topology
Algebraic geometry